Brazil competed in the 2016 Summer Paralympics in Rio de Janeiro, as host country, from 7 September to 18 September 2016.

Support 
In September 2015, a representative from the country attended the Rio 2016 Paralympic Games Chef de Mission seminar as part of the country's preparation efforts for the 2016 Games.

Disability classifications

Every participant at the Paralympics has their disability grouped into one of five disability categories; amputation, the condition may be congenital or sustained through injury or illness; cerebral palsy; wheelchair athletes, there is often overlap between this and other categories; visual impairment, including blindness; Les autres, any physical disability that does not fall strictly under one of the other categories, for example dwarfism or multiple sclerosis. Each Paralympic sport then has its own classifications, dependent upon the specific physical demands of competition. Events are given a code, made of numbers and letters, describing the type of event and classification of the athletes competing. Some sports, such as athletics, divide athletes by both the category and severity of their disabilities, other sports, for example swimming, group competitors from different categories together, the only separation being based on the severity of the disability.

Medalists

Archery

Brazil automatically gets four berths at the 2016 Paralympics as the host nation, but had the ability to qualify additional athletes. At the 2015 World Archery Para Championships, several archers did just that. Francisco Cordeiro did this in the recurve men's open third round, while Jane Karla Gogel did it in the compound women's open by reaching the quarterfinal and Fabíola Lorenzi Dergovics added an extra spot as a result of her performance in the recurve women's open Paralympic secondary tournament. At the Parapan Games Brasil secured more spots with Thais Carvalho in the recurve women's open with a silver medal and Luciano Rezende with a gold medal and Diogo de Souza with the fourth place in the recurve men's open. All members of Brazilian archery team are participating at their first Paralympic Games as Brasil never before qualified an archer for the Paralympic Games, only Jane Karla Gogel had participated in 2008 Beijing and the 2012 London Games in table tennis.

Men

Women

Mixed

Athletics 

Petrúcio Ferreira is expected to be part of the Brazilian athletics delegation. When he was 18 years old, he broke the world record in the 200m T46/47 world record.

Terezinha Guilhermina will defend her three paralympic championships.

Key

Men's track

Men's field

Women's track

Women's field

Boccia 

Brazil qualified for the 2016 Summer Paralympics in this sport at the Montreal hosted 2015 BisFed Americas Pair and Team championship in the Pairs BC3 event. They claimed gold ahead of silver medalist Canada and bronze medalists Colombia.
Dirceu Pinto goes to the Rio Games as the reigning 2008 and 2012 individual BC4 and pairs BC4 gold medalist.

Individual

Pairs and teams

Cycling

Road

Track

Equestrian 

Individual

Team

# Discarded score.

Football 5-a-side 

Brazil qualified for the Paralympics by virtue of being hosts. They also qualified in their own right by winning the IBSA Blind Football World Championships 2014 in Tokyo, Japan. They would also have qualified by virtue of winning the 2015 Parapan American Games in Toronto, Canada, the regional qualifier for the Americas.

Group stage

Semifinal

Gold medal match

Football 7-a-side 

Brazil automatically qualified as the host country. Jan Francisco Brito da Costa is the best player for Brazil, and dominated at the 2015 World Championships. His team finished third at the 2015 CP Football World Championships.

The draw for the tournament was held on May 6 at the 2016 Pre Paralympic Tournament in Salou, Spain. Brazil was put into Group A with Ukraine, Great Britain and Ireland. The tournament where the draw took place featured 7 of the 8 teams participating in Rio. It was the last major preparation event ahead of the Rio Games for all teams participating. Brazil finished second, after losing 0 - 2 to the Ukraine in the 1st place match.

Going into the Rio Games, the country was ranked third in the world.

Group stage

Semifinal

Bronze medal match

Goalball

Men 

Romário Diego Marques is one of the members of the Brazil men's national goalball team. He is expected to be on the roster for Rio, after having been part of the silver medal-winning team at the 2012 Summer Paralympics and the gold medal-winning team at the 2014 IBSA Goalball World Championships. The team automatically qualified as hosts, but they would have qualified in their own right as winners of the 2014 IBSA Goalball World Championships. Brazil's men enter the tournament ranked 5th in the world.

Group stage

Quarterfinal

Semifinal

Bronze medal match

Women 

The Brazil women's national goalball team qualified for the Rio Games as hosts of the competition. They would have qualified in their own right after finishing second at the 2015 Parapan American Games. Brazil's women enter the tournament ranked 2nd in the world.

Group stage

Quarterfinal

Semifinal

Bronze medal match

Judo

Men

Women

Paracanoeing

Qualification Legend: FA = Qualify to medal final; SF = Qualify to semifinal

Paratriathlon

Fernando Aranha, cross-country skier who competed in the 2014 Winter Paralympics, returns to make his debut in the Summer Paralympics competing in the Paratriathlon. He became the first Brazilian paralympic athlete to compete in both the Winter and Summer Paralympics.

Powerlifting

Rowing

One pathway for qualifying for Rio involved having a boat have top eight finish at the 2015 FISA World Rowing Championships in a medal event. Brazil qualified for the 2016 Games under this criteria in the AS Men's Single Sculls event with a seventh-place finish in a time of 04:57.010.

Qualification Legend: FA=Final A (medal); FB=Final B (non-medal); R=Repechage

Sailing

Legend: DNC=Did not come; DNF=Did not finish; DNS=Did not start; STP=Standard Penalty

Shooting 

The last direct qualifying event for Rio in shooting took place at the 2015 IPC Shooting World Cup in Fort Benning in November. Alexandre Galgani earned a qualifying spot for their country at this competition in the R4 Mixed 10m Air Rifle Standing SH2 event.

Qualification Legend: QG = Qualified for Gold Medal Match; QB = Qualified for Bronze Medal Match

Sitting volleyball

Men 
Brazil men's national sitting volleyball team qualified for the 2016 Games as the host nation.

Group stage

Semifinal

Bronze medal match

Women 
Brazil women's national sitting volleyball team qualified for the 2016 Games as the host nation.

Group stage

Semifinal

Bronze medal match

Swimming 

Daniel Dias is a favorite Brazilian swimmer going into the Rio Paralympics. Brazilian swimmers competed at the 2015 IPC Swimming World Championships as part of their Rio readiness efforts.

Key

Men

Women

Mixed

Table tennis 

Men

Women

Wheelchair basketball

Men 

The Brazil men's national wheelchair basketball team has qualified for the 2016 Rio Paralympics by virtue of being the host nation. Brazil had the choice of which group they wanted to be in. They were partnered with Spain, who would be in the group Brazil did not select. Brazil chose Group B, which included Iran, the United States, Great Britain, Germany and Algeria.

|-
|style="text-align:center;" |G||style="text-align:center"|4||Gomes dos Santos, Dwan|| 23 – January 24, 1993 ||style="text-align:center"|1.0 || ADFEGO || style="text-align:right;" |
|-
|style="text-align:center;" |F||style="text-align:center"|5||Vieira, Pedro Henrique|| 22 – November 27, 1993 ||style="text-align:center"|4.0 || Magic Hands || style="text-align:right;" |
|-
|style="text-align:center;" |F||style="text-align:center"|6||da Silva,Erick|| 37 – October 5, 1978 ||style="text-align:center"|3.5 || CAD || style="text-align:right;" |
|-
|style="text-align:center;" |F||style="text-align:center"|7||Suursoo, Celestino Luciano|| 38 – March 10, 1978 ||style="text-align:center"|4.5 || CAD || style="text-align:right;" |
|-
|style="text-align:center;" |C||style="text-align:center"|8||dos Santos, Paulo César|| 43 – November 18, 1972 ||style="text-align:center"|2.0 || CAD || style="text-align:right;" |
|-
|style="text-align:center;" |F||style="text-align:center"|9||do Bonfim, Edjúnior José|| 34 – August 30, 1982 ||style="text-align:center"|4.5 || América Tigres || style="text-align:right;" |
|-
|style="text-align:center;" |C||style="text-align:center"|10||Dauinheimer, Paulo Roberto|| 32 – February 22, 1984 ||style="text-align:center"|1.5 || AFADEFI || style="text-align:right;" |
|-
|style="text-align:center;" |G||style="text-align:center"|11||Arão de Carvalho, Rodrigo|| 38 – July 7, 1978 ||style="text-align:center"|1.0 || Magic Hands || style="text-align:right;" |
|-
|style="text-align:center;" |G||style="text-align:center"|12||Alves Viana, Amauri|| 26 – April 13, 1990 ||style="text-align:center"|1.5 || Magic Hands || style="text-align:right;" |
|-
|style="text-align:center;" |F||style="text-align:center"|13||de Miranda, Leandro|| 34 – August 27, 1982 ||style="text-align:center"|4.5 || GADECAMP || style="text-align:right;" |
|-
|style="text-align:center;" |C||style="text-align:center"|14||Sanchez, Marcos Cândido|| 34 – July 20, 1982 ||style="text-align:center"|3.0 || GADECAMP || style="text-align:right;" |
|-
|style="text-align:center;" |F||style="text-align:center"|14||da Silva Júnior, Gelson|| 36 – March 6, 1980 ||style="text-align:center"|3.0 || Magic Hands || style="text-align:right;" |

Group stage

Quarterfinal

Fifth place match

Women 

The Brazil women's national wheelchair basketball team has qualified for the 2016 Rio Paralympics. As hosts, Brazil got to choose which group they were put into. They were partnered with Algeria, who would be put in the group they did not chose. Brazil chose Group A, which included Canada, Germany, Great Britain and Argentina. Algeria ended up in Group B with the United States, the Netherlands, France and China.

|-
|style="text-align:center;" |C||style="text-align:center"|4||Silva, Ivanilde|| 26 – April 24, 1990 ||style="text-align:center"|3.5 || IREFES || style="text-align:right;" |
|-
|style="text-align:center;" |G||style="text-align:center"|5||Farias, Andreia|| 30 – April 23, 1986 ||style="text-align:center"|1.0 || ADM || style="text-align:right;" |
|-
|style="text-align:center;" |C||style="text-align:center"|6||Assunção, Perla|| 30 – January 28, 1986 ||style="text-align:center"|2.0 || Allstar Rodas || style="text-align:right;" |
|-
|style="text-align:center;" |G||style="text-align:center"|7||Costa, Lucicléia|| 36 – August 16, 1980 ||style="text-align:center"|2.5 || Allstar Rodas || style="text-align:right;" |
|-
|style="text-align:center;" |G||style="text-align:center"|8||Ramos, Rosália|| 46 – January 22, 1970 ||style="text-align:center"|1.5 || Riopretense || style="text-align:right;" |
|-
|style="text-align:center;" |C||style="text-align:center"|9||Rosa, Ana Aurélia|| 27 – September 10, 1988 ||style="text-align:center"|3.5 || Riopretense || style="text-align:right;" |
|-
|style="text-align:center;" |C||style="text-align:center"|10||Santana, Jéssica|| 23 – December 7, 1992 ||style="text-align:center"|2.5 || IREFES || style="text-align:right;" |
|-
|style="text-align:center;" |F||style="text-align:center"|11||Vieira, Geisa|| 24 – August 27, 1992 ||style="text-align:center"|4.0 || GAADIN || style="text-align:right;" |
|-
|style="text-align:center;" |F||style="text-align:center"|12||Martins, Lia|| 29 – June 9, 1987 ||style="text-align:center"|4.5 || GAADIN || style="text-align:right;" |
|-
|style="text-align:center;" |G||style="text-align:center"|13||Maia, Geisiane|| 34 – February 15, 1982 ||style="text-align:center"|3.0 || IREFES || style="text-align:right;" |
|-
|style="text-align:center;" |F||style="text-align:center"|14||Klokler, Paola|| 25 – January 26, 1991 ||style="text-align:center"|4.0 || ADDECE || style="text-align:right;" |
|-
|style="text-align:center;" |F||style="text-align:center"|14||Almeida, Vileide|| 24 – November 2, 1991 ||style="text-align:center"|4.5 || Allstar Rodas || style="text-align:right;" |

Group stage

Quarterfinal

Seventh place match

Wheelchair fencing

Men

Women

Wheelchair rugby 

The Brazil national wheelchair rugby team has qualified for the 2016 Rio Paralympics by virtue of being the host nation. Brazil was scheduled to open play in Rio against Canada on September 14. Their second game was scheduled to be against Australia on September 15. Their final game of group play as against the Great Britain on September 16. Brazil entered the tournament ranked number nineteen in the world.

Group stage

Seventh place match

Wheelchair tennis

Singles

Doubles

See also
Brazil at the 2015 Pan American Games
Brazil at the 2015 Parapan American Games
Brazil at the 2016 Winter Youth Olympics
Brazil at the 2016 Summer Olympics

References

Nations at the 2016 Summer Paralympics
2016
2016 in Brazilian sport